Stigmella johannis is a moth of the family Nepticulidae. It was described by Zeller in 1877, and is known from Bogotá, Colombia.

References

Nepticulidae
Moths described in 1877
Endemic fauna of Colombia
Moths of South America